SIOC may mean:
 Ships in own container
 Semantically-Interlinked Online Communities
 Socialism in One Country